Jabril Cox (born April 16, 1998) is an American football linebacker for the Dallas Cowboys of the National Football League (NFL). He was selected by the Cowboys in the fourth round of the 2021 NFL Draft. He played college football at North Dakota State, where he won three FCS championships and was named the MVFC defensive player of the year, before transferring to LSU.

Early years
Cox grew up in Kansas City, Missouri and attended Raytown South High School. As a sophomore, he was a two-way starter at linebacker and wide receiver, tallying 101 tackles (13 tackles for loss), 509 receiving yards and 9 touchdowns, while receiving All-conference honors on defense.

As a junior, he was named the starter as a dual-threat quarterback, posting 1,300 passing yards, 17 passing touchdowns and 830 rushing yards, while earning All-district and All-conference honors. He suffered a torn ACL injury during the season.

As a senior, he posted 2,103 passing yards, 18 passing touchdowns, 1,004 rushing yards and 13 rushing touchdowns. During his career he also played as a safety and cornerback. He was a four-year starter for the basketball and baseball teams.

College career
Cox accepted a football scholarship from North Dakota State University. As a redshirt freshman, he was converted into a linebacker. He appeared in all 15 games with 8 starts, registering 75 tackles (led the team), 13 tackles for loss (led the team), 4.5 sacks, 6 quarterback hurries, 3 pass breakups and 3 fumble recoveries. In the sixth game against Youngstown State University, he replaced an injured Chris Board and had 3 sacks. He made 13 tackles (7 solo) in the semifinal 55–13 win over Sam Houston State University. He was named second-team All-MVFC and the conference Newcomer of the Year.

As a sophomore, he was named the conference Defensive Player of the Year and first-team All-MVFC, after recording 15 starts, 91 total tackles (led the team), 9.5 tackles for loss, 4 sacks, 7 quarterback hurries and 4 interceptions, two of which he returned for touchdowns. He had 10 tackles in the FCS second round playoff 52–10 win over Montana State University.

As a junior, he started 15 games, making 92 tackles (led the team), 57 solo tackles (second in school history), 9.5 tackles for loss, 5.5 sacks, 5 quarterback hurries, one interception and 6 pass breakups. He missed the eleventh game against the University of South Dakota with an injury. He had 8 tackles in the quarterfinal 9–3 win over Illinois State University and in the championship 28–20 win over James Madison University. He was named first-team All-MVFC for a second straight season, as well as a third-team All-American by the Associated Press. He finished the season fourth in school history with 158 career solo tackles and fifth with 190 career interception return yards. He contributed to his team winning three straight FCS Championships and having a 45-1 overall record. He finished his career with the Bisons with 38 starts in 45 games, 258 tackles (32 tackles for loss), 14 sacks, 6 interceptions and scored two defensive touchdowns.

In 2020, he moved on to Louisiana State University as a graduate transfer, looking to improve as a player. He was one of the few bright spots on a team that struggled to a 5-5 overall record, after winning the CFP Championship the previous season. He collected 58 tackles (third on the team), 6.5 tackles for loss, one sack, one fumble recovery, 8 pass breakups and 3 interceptions (one returned for a 14-yard touchdown). He had a sack and returned an interception 14 yards for a touchdown in the season opening 34–44 loss against Mississippi State University. He had 9 tackles against the University of Alabama. Following the season, Cox announced he would enter the 2021 NFL Draft.

Professional career

Dallas Cowboys
Cox was selected by the Dallas Cowboys in the fourth round (115th overall) of the 2021 NFL Draft. He signed his rookie contract on May 20, 2021.

During a Week 8 game against the Minnesota Vikings, Cox suffered an apparent knee injury. On November 1, 2021, the MRI revealed Cox suffered a torn ACL. Cox was subsequently placed on the season-ending injured reserve.

Personal life
Cox's mother, Lotu, was born in American Samoa. He has 6 siblings.

References

External links
LSU Tigers bio
North Dakota State Bison bio

1998 births
Living people
Sportspeople from the Kansas City metropolitan area
Players of American football from Missouri
Players of American football from Kansas City, Missouri
American football linebackers
American football wide receivers
American football safeties
American football cornerbacks
American football quarterbacks
North Dakota State Bison football players
LSU Tigers football players
Dallas Cowboys players
American people of Samoan descent